Zoundwéogo is one of the 45 provinces of Burkina Faso, located in its Centre-Sud Region. In 2019 the population of Zoundwéogo was 311,940. Its capital is Manga.

Education
In 2011 the province had 210 primary schools and 18 secondary schools.

Healthcare
In 2011 the province had 33 health and social promotion centers (Centres de santé et de promotion sociale), 3 doctors and 77 nurses.

Departments

See also
Regions of Burkina Faso
Provinces of Burkina Faso
Departments of Burkina Faso

References

 
Provinces of Burkina Faso